Chelidonura is a genus of small, sometimes colorful, sea slugs. These are headshield slugs or cephalaspideans, marine opisthobranch gastropod mollusks in the family Aglajidae.

The two rather long "tails" at the end of the animal are characteristic of the genus.

Species 
Species with the genus Chelidonura include:

 Chelidonura alisonae Gosliner, 2011
 Chelidonura amoena Bergh, 1905
 Chelidonura castanea Yonow, 1994
 Chelidonura cubana Ortea & Martínez, 1997
 Chelidonura electra  Rudman, 1970
 Chelidonura flavolobata  Heller & Thompson 1983
 Chelidonura fulvipunctata Baba, 1938
 Chelidonura hirundinina (Quoy & Gaimard, 1833)
 Chelidonura inornata Baba, 1949
 Chelidonura livida  Yonow, 1994  
 Chelidonura mariagordae Ortea, Espinosa & Moro, 2004
 Chelidonura normani Ornelas-Gatdula, Dupont & Valdés, 2011 
 Chelidonura orchidaea  Perrone, 1990  
 Chelidonura pallida Risbec, 1951 
 Chelidonura punctata Eliot, 1903
 Chelidonura sandrana  Rudman, 1973  
 Chelidonura varians Eliot, 1903 

Species  brought into synonymy 
 Chelidonura aureopunctata Rudman, 1968: synonym of Philinopsis taronga (Allan, 1933)
 Chelidonura babai Gosliner, 1988: synonym of Chelidonura sandrana Rudman, 1973
 Chelidonura conformata Burn, 1966: synonym of Biuve fulvipunctata (Baba, 1938)
 Chelidonura italica Sordi, 1980: synonym of Camachoaglaja africana (Pruvot-Fol, 1953)
 Chelidonura larramendii Ortea, Espinosa & Moro, 2009: synonym  of Camachoaglaja larramendii (Ortea, Espinosa & Moro, 2009)
 Chelidonura mediterranea Swennen, 1961: synonym of Biuve fulvipunctata (Baba, 1938)
 Chelidonura nyanyana Edmunds, 1968: synonym of Navanax orbignyanus (Rochebrune, 1881)
 Chelidonura petra Ev. Marcus, 1976: synonym of Spinoaglaja petra (Ev. Marcus, 1976)
 Chelidonura philinopsis Eliot, 1903:  synonym of Chelidonura hirundinina (Quoy & Gaimard, 1833)
 Chelidonura sabadiega Ortea, Moro & Espinosa, 1997: synonym of Mannesia sabadiega (Ortea, Moro & Espinosa, 1997)

References 

 Gofas, S.; Le Renard, J.; Bouchet, P. (2001). Mollusca, in: Costello, M.J. et al. (Ed.) (2001). European register of marine species: a check-list of the marine species in Europe and a bibliography of guides to their identification. Collection Patrimoines Naturels, 50: pp. 180–213

External links 

 The Guardian ; Chelidonura mandroroa; 16 October 2011

Aglajidae
Gastropod genera
Taxa named by Arthur Adams (zoologist)